Kaare Meland (22 May 1915 –  31 December 2002) was a Norwegian politician for the Conservative Party.

He was born in Bergen.

He was elected to the Norwegian Parliament from Hordaland in 1965, but was not re-elected in 1969. He had previously served in the position of deputy representative during the terms 1954–1957 and 1958–1961. From August to September 1963 he served as the Minister of Industry during the short-lived centre-right cabinet Lyng.

Meland was a member of Fana municipality council from 1945 to 1951, and later became mayor from 1956–1959. In 1955–1959 he was also a member of Hordaland county council.

Outside politics he graduated from the Norwegian School of Economics and Business Administration in 1939 and became an authorized financial auditor in 1945. He was CEO of Bergens sparebank from 1964 to 1980.

References

1915 births
2002 deaths
Conservative Party (Norway) politicians
Members of the Storting
Government ministers of Norway
Mayors of places in Hordaland
Politicians from Bergen
Norwegian School of Economics alumni
20th-century Norwegian politicians
Ministers of Trade and Shipping of Norway